Spinosomatidia obesa is a species of beetle in the family Cerambycidae, and the only species in the genus Spinosomatidia. It was described by Hunt and Stephan von Breuning in 1955.

References

Parmenini
Beetles described in 1955